Hoft is a surname. Notable people with the surname include:

Arend van 't Hoft (born 1933), Dutch racing cyclist
Cyril Hoft (1896–1949), Australian rules footballer
Jim Hoft, conservative pundit

See also
Hoeft
Holt (surname)